Allan Calderwood McKinstrey Todd (5 October 1910 – 1975) was a Scottish footballer who played as a goalkeeper. He played for Scottish clubs Leith Athletic and Cowdenbeath, and represented English sides Port Vale, Nottingham Forest, and Darlington.

Career
Todd played for Wellesley, Leith Athletic and Cowdenbeath, before joining English side Port Vale in October 1932. He featured nine times for the "Valiants" in 1932–33, but remained at The Old Recreation Ground whilst rivals Jock Leckie and Ben Davies both departed. He played 29 times in 1933–34, beating off competition from Ormond Jones. However, he played just once in 1935–36, as the club suffered relegation with John Potts between the sticks. Todd played 39 times in the Third Division North in 1936–37, but refused a new contract with Vale and was given a free transfer to Nottingham Forest in exchange for Arthur Masters. After leaving the City Ground, Todd later played for Darlington.

Career statistics
Source:

References

1910 births
1975 deaths
People from Perth and Kinross
Scottish footballers
Association football goalkeepers
Leith Athletic F.C. players
Cowdenbeath F.C. players
Port Vale F.C. players
Nottingham Forest F.C. players
Darlington F.C. players
Scottish Football League players
English Football League players